Kario is a city in Sindh Province, Pakistan.The name of Kario Ghanwar is mean by Kario is a river and Ghanwar is the name of Person and Father of Khalifa Mehmood Faqeer (A.S)

K
Populated places in Sindh